Santa Cruz, San Jose may refer to any of the following barangays in the Philippines:
 Santa Cruz, San Jose, Camarines Sur
 Santa Cruz, San Jose, Dinagat Islands